The Men's 1500m Freestyle event at the 2003 Pan American Games took place on August 17, 2003 (Day 16 of the Games).

Ricardo Monasterio won the gold medal, breaking a string of 12 U.S. titles in a row. Before him, only other non-American had won the race, the Brazilian Tetsuo Okamoto, in the first edition of the Games in 1951.

Medalists

Records

Results

Notes

References
2003 Pan American Games Results: Day 16, CBC online; retrieved 2009-06-13.
usaswimming

Freestyle, 1500m